The 1908 Auckland City mayoral election was part of the New Zealand local elections held that same year. In 1908, elections were held for the Mayor of Auckland.

Background
Incumbent mayor Arthur Myers re-elected unopposed for a then record fourth consecutive term. Myers did not serve out his full term and resigned the mayoralty in March 1909. Councillor Charles Grey was elected by the council to fill the vacancy for the remainder of the term. The mayoral contest coincided with a vacancy on the Auckland City Council following the resignation of councillor Robert Stopford triggering a by-election. Six candidates contested the seat which was ultimately won by John Patterson, a local businessman.

Council by-election

Notes

References

Mayoral elections in Auckland
1908 elections in New Zealand
Politics of the Auckland Region
1900s in Auckland